Valentin Andreyevich Golubev (born 3 May 1992) is a Russian volleyball player for Zenit-Kazan and the Russian national team.

He participated at the 2017 Men's European Volleyball Championship.

Sporting achievements

Clubs

FIVB Club World Championship
  Betim 2019 – with Zenit Kazan

References

National team
 2019  FIVB Nations League

1992 births
Living people
Russian men's volleyball players
Volleyball players at the 2010 Summer Youth Olympics
Universiade gold medalists for Russia
Universiade medalists in volleyball
Medalists at the 2013 Summer Universiade
Volleyball players at the 2020 Summer Olympics
Olympic volleyball players of Russia
Medalists at the 2020 Summer Olympics
Olympic silver medalists for the Russian Olympic Committee athletes
Olympic medalists in volleyball
VC Belogorie players
VC Zenit Kazan players